Brotton is a village in the civil parish of Skelton and Brotton and situated approximately  south-east of Saltburn-by-the-Sea, 9 miles from Redcar,   east of Middlesbrough and  north-west of Whitby.

In 2011, the village had a population of 5,394. It is in the borough of Redcar and Cleveland, North Yorkshire, England. East Cleveland Hospital operates in the village.

History 

The name of the village (known in medieval times as 'Broctune') means Brook Farm (settlement by a stream), being derived from the Old English brōc and tūn.
The village is listed in the Domesday Book, and used to be in the Langbaurgh Wapentake. Warsett Hill tops the large Huntcliffe which was the site of one of the many Roman signal stations built along the east coast to defend against Anglo-Saxon attack. Brotton was one of a number of manors granted by William the Conqueror to Robert de Brus, Lord of Skelton.
 Over recent years Brotton has become somewhat isolated because of a bypass which was opened in stages between 1998 and 2001 connecting the town of Skelton-in-Cleveland and village of Carlin How.

The discovery of ironstone brought major changes to the village and a large increase in the population. The majority of former miners' homes are found in the 'Brickyard' and 'the Park' areas of the village. Lumpsey Mine, the largest of the Brotton mines, opened in the 1880s and closed in 1954.
During the First World War Lumpsey Mine had a rail-mounted artillery piece to defend the mine against Zeppelin attack.

Geography 

Brotton is close to the seaside town of Saltburn-by-the-Sea, known for its pier, and Guisborough, with its ancient Priory and market.
The village  is divided into two parts: 'Top End' (the area east of the railway line) and 'Bottom End' (the area to the west).

Landmarks 

Brotton Anglican church is dedicated to St Margaret.
The village contains a parade of shops on High Street, and its public houses include The Green Tree and The Queen's Arms.

Education 

Brotton has two primary schools, Badger Hill Primary School and St Peters Church of England school.
There is also a school for children with learning difficulties, Kilton Thorpe.
The village secondary school, Freebrough Academy, has recently been rebuilt.

Notable people 

The sculptor Charles Robinson Sykes (1875–1950), was born in the village. There is a house on Child Street which has a plaque dedicated to him.
He designed the Spirit of Ecstasy mascot which is used on Rolls-Royce cars.

References

Sources

External links 

 Skelton & Brotton Parish Council
 Redcar & Cleveland Borough Council
 "Welcome to Brotton History", This is the North East, Communigate.co.uk

Redcar and Cleveland
Places in the Tees Valley
Villages in North Yorkshire